Hélène Papper is the Global Communications and Advocacy Director for the UN specialized agency and international financial institution, IFAD, the International Fund for Agricultural Development. She came on board after  leading the United Nations Information Centre in Bogota, for Colombia, Ecuador and Venezuela for four years. Prior to this appointment of 4 March 2016 by United Nations Secretary-General Ban Ki-moon, she was the Founder and Chief of MikadoFm, the national peacekeeping radio for the United Nations Multidimensional Integrated Stabilization Mission in Mali (MINUSMA) .

Biographical Information
Ms. Papper is a conflict and post-conflict strategist and leader with  extensive experience in the field of diplomacy, advocacy, and communications. Having dedicated her life to giving a voice to the most vulnerable communities, focusing on those most often left behind in rural areas across the globe, and empowering  women and girls in conflict and post-conflict contexts, she now leads global communications and advocacy at IFAD, a hybrid UN specialized agency and international financial institution focused on rural development and rural populations. Previously she directed the UN Information Center for Colombia, Écuador and Venezuela where she led strong advocacy programs in the fields of gender, climate, environment, social inclusion, education aligned with the UN 2030 Agenda. Additionally she is a recognized public speaker on gender violence and is called upon to give conferences and help develop advocacy tools to influence policy. Prior to that, she was invited to join the UN  Peacekeeping Mission in Mali to set up a national radio which would support the process for peace and reconciliation. She trained journalists from across the country, and negotiated with national and local governments for the need to have protected spaces for dialogue and ensured the national radio become a key tool for inclusiveness women and girls in the main national and local languages. Today, the UN Peacekeeping radio, MikadoFM, has changed the media landscape in the country. From 2012 to 2014, she was a Senior Expert for the African Development Bank in Tunisia working on advocacy tools for sustainable and inclusive development . From 2009 to 2011, she held the position of Deputy Chief of Radio and Head of Public Information programmes with the United Nations Mission in South Sudan (UNMISS) as well as Chief of Radio with United Nations Mission in Haiti (MINUSTAH). In 2009, she was a visiting fellow at UC Berkeley Graduate School of Journalism after receiving a Rotary International Peace fellowship for her work in researching the role of communications for peace and conflict resolution. From 2006 to 2009, she was a correspondent for France 24 television in Paris. In addition, Ms. Papper has experience as a news director, a trainer for television and radio. Previously, she was a journalist, producer and host/anchor for several other news outlets such as Radio France International and National Public Radio where she started her career. She is a graduate of Sorbonne Nouvelle University with a master's degree in literature and postcolonial civilization. She also holds both a Bachelor of Arts and of Science from Syracuse University in Broadcast Journalism and Political Science.

References

French officials of the United Nations
Living people
Year of birth missing (living people)